PTI-1 (SGT-48) is an indole-based synthetic cannabinoid. It is one of few synthetic cannabinoids containing a thiazole group and is closely related to PTI-2. These compounds may be viewed as simplified analogues of indole-3-heterocycle compounds originally developed by Organon and subsequently further researched by Merck.

See also 

 JWH-018
 LBP-1 (drug)
 PTI-2

References 

Indoles
Thiazoles
Cannabinoids
Designer drugs
Diethylamino compounds